The Gov. John Hopwood Mickey House, at State St. in Osceola, Nebraska, was built in c.1883-1884.  It was a home of John Hopwood Mickey.  In 1977 the house was leased by, and was also known as, the Polk County Historical Museum, which includes other historic buildings that have been moved onto the property.

Alone out of the buildings on the property, the house was listed on the National Register of Historic Places in 1977.

References

External links 

Houses on the National Register of Historic Places in Nebraska
Houses completed in 1883
Houses in Polk County, Nebraska
National Register of Historic Places in Polk County, Nebraska